Fred Schreyer served as the CEO and Commissioner of the Professional Bowlers Association (PBA). Schreyer joined the PBA in October 2002, serving as the Chief Operating Officer and General Counsel. He later became the PBA Commissioner in 2003. When Steve Miller  resigned in September 2005, Schreyer took over the leadership of the PBA, but continued in his role as Commissioner, as well.  Schreyer retired in 2011.

External links
Fred Schreyer's official PBA biography

Living people
Year of birth missing (living people)
Place of birth missing (living people)